Leibel may refer to:

 Allan Leibel (born 1945), Canadian sailor
 Blake Leibel (born 1981), Canadian murderer
 Kyla Leibel (born 2001), Canadian swimmer
 Lorne Leibel (born 1941), Canadian sailor
 Rudolph Leibel (born 1942), American research professor
 Stanley Leibel (born 1927), Canadian sailor
 Terry Leibel, Canadian journalist and equestrian